Olyokminsk (Ölüöxüme) is a town and the administrative center of Olyokminsky District in the Sakha Republic, Russia,  southwest of Yakutsk, the capital of the republic. As of the 2010 Census, its population was 9,494.

History
It was founded in 1635 as an ostrog by the Cossacks led by Pyotr Beketov, sited on the left bank of the Lena opposite the mouth of the Olyokma River. The outpost was later moved a few kilometers upstream, to a location less prone to flooding in spring.

As the junction for river traffic on the Lena and Olyokma, it was the base for Russian expeditions further east and eventually became a trade center on the river route to Yakutsk. Town status was granted to it in 1783.

Decembrists Nikolay Chizhov and Andrey Andreyev were exiled here.

During World War II, an airfield was built here for the Alaska-Siberian (ALSIB) air route used to ferry American Lend-Lease aircraft to the Eastern Front.

Geography
The town is located on the left bank of the Lena River. To the north rises the Lena Plateau and to the south, beyond the right bank of the Lena, lies the Olyokma-Chara Plateau.

Administrative and municipal status
Within the framework of administrative divisions, Olyokminsk serves as the administrative center of Olyokminsky District. As an inhabited locality, Olyokminsk is classified as a town under district jurisdiction. As an administrative division, it is, together with four rural localities, incorporated within Olyokminsky District as the Town of Olyokminsk. As a municipal division, the Town of Olyokminsk is incorporated within Olyokminsky Municipal District as Olyokminsk Urban Settlement.

Economy and infrastructure
Timber processing and a power plant are the focus of the town's economy, along with farming in the surrounding area.

Transportation
Olyokminsk is served by the Olyokminsk Airport .

Culture and sights
The town is notable for a number of surviving pre-20th century wooden architecture, including the Alexander Nevsky Chapel (1891) and Cathedral of Our Savior (1860).

Climate
Olyokminsk has a subarctic climate (Köppen climate classification Dfc). In the summer months of June, July, and August, it is not uncommon for temperatures to surpass  during the day. Precipitation is significantly higher in summer than at other times of the year. Although summers are similar to republic capital Yakutsk, winters are less severe courtesy of the lower latitude. As a result, Olyokminsk is rare for the Sakha Republic cities in that it has recorded above-freezing temperatures during January and February. Those episodes are rare and very short-lived.

July is the only month when temperatures never dropped below  and December is only month when temperatures have never reached .

References

Notes

Sources
Official website of the Sakha Republic. Registry of the Administrative-Territorial Divisions of the Sakha Republic. Olyokminsky District. 

Cities and towns in the Sakha Republic
Road-inaccessible communities of the Sakha Republic
Populated places on the Lena River